Dispersions are unstable from the thermodynamic point of view; however, they can be kinetically stable over a large period of time, which determines their shelf life. This time span needs to be measured in order to ensure the best product quality to the final consumer. 
“Dispersion stability refers to the ability of a dispersion to resist change in its properties over time.” D.J. McClements.

Destabilisation phenomena of a dispersion

These destabilisations can be classified into two major processes:
 Migration phenomena : whereby the difference in density between the continuous and dispersed phase, leads to gravitational phase separation:
Creaming, when the dispersed phase is less dense than the continuous phase (e.g. milk, cosmetic cream, soft drinks, etc.)
Sedimentation, when the dispersed phase is denser than the continuous phase (e.g. ink, CMP slurries, paint, etc.)
 Particle size increase phenomena: whereby the size of the dispersed phase (drops, particles, bubbles) increases
reversibly (flocculation)
irreversibly (aggregation, coalescence, Ostwald ripening)

Technique monitoring physical stability
Multiple light scattering coupled with vertical scanning is the most widely used technique to monitor the dispersion state of a product, identifying and quantifying destabilisation phenomena. It works on concentrated dispersions without dilution. When light is sent through the sample, it is backscattered by the particles / droplets. The backscattering intensity is directly proportional to the size and volume fraction of the dispersed phase. Therefore, local changes in concentration (creaming and sedimentation) and global changes in size (flocculation, coalescence) are detected and monitored.

Accelerating methods for shelf life prediction
The kinetic process of destabilisation can be rather long (up to several months or even years for some products) and it is often required for the formulator to use further accelerating methods in order to reach reasonable development time for new product design. Thermal methods are the most commonly used and consist in increasing temperature to accelerate destabilisation (below critical temperatures of phase inversion or chemical degradation). Temperature affects not only the viscosity, but also interfacial tension in the case of non-ionic surfactants or more generally interaction forces inside the system. Storing a dispersion at high temperatures makes it possible to simulate real life conditions for a product (e.g. tube of sunscreen cream in a car in the summer), but also to accelerate destabilisation processes up to 200 times.

Mechanical acceleration, including vibration, centrifugation and agitation, are sometimes used. They subject the product to different forces that push the particles / droplets against one another, hence helping in the film drainage. However, some emulsions would never coalesce in normal gravity, while they do under artificial gravity. Moreover, segregation of different populations of particles have been highlighted when using centrifugation and vibration.

References

Laboratory techniques